The 34th edition of the annual Hypo-Meeting took place on May 31 and June 1, 2008 in Götzis, Austria. The track and field competition, featuring a decathlon (men) and a heptathlon (women) event was part of the 2008 IAAF World Combined Events Challenge.

Men's Decathlon

Schedule

May 31

June 1

Records

Results

Women's Heptathlon

Schedule

May 31 

June 1

Records

Results

See also
Athletics at the 2008 Summer Olympics – Men's decathlon
Athletics at the 2008 Summer Olympics – Women's heptathlon

References
 decathlon2000
 IAAF results

2008
Hypo-Meeting
Hypo-Meeting